Mike McCready is an American musician, the lead guitarist for Pearl Jam.

Mike McCready may also refer to:
Mike McCready (politician), former member of the Michigan House of Representatives
Mike McCready (businessman), American entrepreneur
Michael McCready (fencer), British Olympic fencer